Karl Ludwig Harding (29 September 1765 – 31 August 1834) was a German astronomer, who discovered 3 Juno, the third asteroid of the main-belt in 1804. The lunar crater Harding and the asteroid 2003 Harding are named in his honor.

Harding was born in Lauenburg. From 1786–89, he was educated at the University of Göttingen, where he studied theology, mathematics, and physics.  In 1796 Johann Hieronymus Schröter hired Harding as a tutor for his son. Schröter was an enthusiastic astronomer, and Harding was soon appointed observer and inspector in his observatory.

In 1800, he was among the 24 astronomers invited to participate in the celestial police, a group dedicated to finding additional planets in the solar system.  As part of the group, in 1804, Harding discovered Juno at Schröter's observatory. In the same year he was appointed professor of astronomy in Göttingen and left Lilienthal, where his successor became Friedrich Wilhelm Bessel.

In addition to Juno, he discovered three comets and the variable stars R Virginis, R Aquarii, R Serpentis and S Serpentis.

He also published:
Atlas novus coelestis (1808–1823; re-edited by Jahn, 1856) which catalogued 120,000 stars
Kleine astronomische Ephemeriden (edited with Wiessen, 1830–35)
the fifteenth in the series of Sternkarten of the Berlin Academy's publications (1830)

References 

 
 
 N. N.: Biographical notice of Professor Harding. Monthly Notices of the Royal Astronomical Society, Vol. 3 (1835), S. 86 (Nachruf, englisch)

External links 
 Publications by K. L. Harding in Astrophysics Data System

1765 births
1834 deaths
People from Lauenburg (Elbe)
19th-century German astronomers
Discoverers of asteroids
Discoverers of comets
Fellows of the Royal Society
University of Göttingen alumni
Academic staff of the University of Göttingen
Recipients of the Lalande Prize
18th-century German astronomers